Harris & Ewing Photographic Studio is an historic structure located in downtown Washington, D.C.  It was built in 1924 and listed on the National Register of Historic Places in 1994.

History
The building housed Harris & Ewing, which in the early 20th century was the largest news photo service in the United States.  They also served as the official White House photographer and the city's most noted portrait photographers from 1905 to 1955.  This building with its Italian Renaissance Revival limestone façade replaced an earlier building built by Harris & Ewing in 1905. It was designed by the architectural firm of Sonnemann & Justement.

Today the building houses advertising agency Don Schaaf & Friends, Inc. (ds+f).

References

External links

Commercial buildings completed in 1924
1924 establishments in Washington, D.C.
Renaissance Revival architecture in Washington, D.C.
Commercial buildings on the National Register of Historic Places in Washington, D.C.